Richard Naawu (born 5 February 1971) is a retired Ghanaian football striker. He played the 1992 Africa Cup of Nations Final, scoring his penalty in the lengthy penalty shootout.

References

1971 births
Living people
Ghanaian footballers
Ghana international footballers
1992 African Cup of Nations players
Accra Hearts of Oak S.C. players
FC Viktoria Köln players
SV Waldhof Mannheim players
Wuppertaler SV players
SK Vorwärts Steyr players
Association football forwards
Ghanaian expatriate footballers
Expatriate footballers in Germany
Ghanaian expatriate sportspeople in Germany
Expatriate footballers in Austria
Ghanaian expatriate sportspeople in Austria
2. Bundesliga players
Austrian Football Bundesliga players